{{Infobox martial artist
| name            = Daniel Sarafian
| other_names     =
| image           =
| alt             =
| caption         =
| birth_name      = Daniel Sarafian Gantman
| birth_date      = 
| birth_place     = São Paulo, Brazil
| death_date      =
| death_place     =
| death_cause     =
| residence       =
| nationality     = Brazilian
| ethnicity       = Armenian
| height          = 
| weight          = 
| weight_footnote = 
| weight_class    = Light HeavyweightMiddleweightWelterweight
| reach           = 
| style           =
| stance          = Orthodox
| fighting_out_of = São Paulo, Brazil
| team            = Power MMA And Fitness
| rank            = Black belt in Brazilian Jiu-Jitsu
| years_active    = 2006–present| mma_kowin       = 1
| mma_subwin      = 7
| mma_decwin      = 3
| mma_koloss      = 2
| mma_subloss     = 1
| mma_decloss     = 3
| mma_draw        =
| mma_nc          =
| url             =
| sherdog         = 17665
| footnotes       =
| updated         =
}}

Daniel Sarafian Gantman (born 21 August 1982 in São Paulo) is an Armenian-Brazilian mixed martial artist who last competed in 2018. A professional since 2006, Sarafian has formerly competed for the UFC, Bellator, Absolute Championship Berkut, and was a competitor on Globo's The Ultimate Fighter: Brazil.

Background
Sarafian started training in the martial arts at the age of five years under his grandfather who was a black belt in judo. Sarafian took solely judo classes until he was ten years old when he began training karate. At sixteen he began taking lessons in Brazilian jiu-jitsu. After entering high school and getting constantly picked on for being overweight, Sarafian began working out and training MMA. Only a couple classes into MMA, Sarafian "fell in love with fighting".

Mixed martial arts career
Early career
Sarafian made his professional debut at Predator FC 2 against Jorge Luis Bezerra, winning the fight via submission in round three. In his next bout, he agreed to fight UFC and Strikeforce veteran Mike Whitehead. Sarafian lost the fight via unanimous decision. After his bout with Whitehead Sarafian was asked to take a fight for District Combat Promotions, a small promotion based in the United States. Sarafian took the fight and won via submission (armbar) in the third round.

Sarafian stayed in the United States and fought on the Texas' promotion, Xtreme Fight Championship. He fought Cedric Marks and won the fight via submission in the first round. Sarafian then signed a one-fight deal with Bellator Fighting Championships to compete on their first fight card of their inaugural season. Sarafian fought Gary Padilla, losing in the second round via referee stoppage. Sarafian racked up four straight wins before signing on to take part on The Ultimate Fighter.

The Ultimate Fighter
In March 2012, it was revealed that Sarafian was selected to be a participant on The Ultimate Fighter: Brazil. Sarafian defeated Richardson Moreira via decision to move into the Ultimate Fighter house, and become an official cast member.

Sarafian was selected as the third pick (sixth overall) by Vitor Belfort to be a part of Team Belfort. In the first Middleweight fight of the season, Sarafian was selected to fight Renee Forte. Sarafian dominated the fight and won via rear naked choke in the second round.

In the semi-finals Sarafian was selected to fight Sérgio Moraes. Sarafian won the fight in the first round via KO after hitting Moraes with a flying knee as he dropped for a take down. The win moved Sarafian into the finals of the middleweight tournament, set to take place at the UFC 147.

Ultimate Fighting Championship
Sarafian was scheduled to officially make his UFC debut at UFC 147 on 23 June 2012, to determine the middleweight winner of The Ultimate Fighter: Brazil. However, due to an injury, Sarafian was replaced by Sérgio Moraes and did not compete at the event.

In his debut, Sarafian faced C.B. Dollaway on 19 January 2013, at UFC on FX: Belfort vs. Bisping. He lost the back-and-forth fight via split decision. Despite the loss, it was awarded the Fight of the Night honors.

Sarafian faced promotional newcomer Eddie Mendez on 8 June 2013, at UFC on Fuel TV 10. He won the fight via arm triangle submission in the first round.

In what was originally set to be The Ultimate Fighter: Brazil middleweight final, Sarafian faced Cezar Ferreira on 9 November 2013 at UFC Fight Night 32. He lost the fight via split decision.

Sarafian faced Kiichi Kunimoto in a welterweight bout on 14 June 2014, at UFC 174. He lost the fight via rear-naked choke submission in the first round.

Sarafian was expected to return to middleweight and face Dan Miller on 20 December 2014, at UFC Fight Night 58. However, Miller pulled out of the bout on 11 December and was replaced by promotional newcomer Antônio dos Santos. Sarafian won the fight via second round TKO as dos Santos dislocated a finger and was unable to continue.

Sarafian was expected to face Ricardo Abreu on 6 June 2015, at UFC Fight Night 68. However on 4 May, Sarafian was forced to withdraw from the event due to injury and was replaced by Jake Collier.

Sarafian was expected to face Sam Alvey on 21 February 2016, at UFC Fight Night 83. However, Alvey pulled out of the bout in late December after sustaining a broken jaw and was replaced by Oluwale Bamgbose Sarafian lost the fight via knockout in the first round. After his loss to Bamgbose, Sarafian was subsequently released from the promotion

Championships and accomplishments
Mixed martial arts
 Ultimate Fighting Championship
 *The Ultimate Fighter: Brazil Middleweight Tournament Finalist (replaced due to injury by Sérgio Moraes)

Mixed martial arts record

|-
|Win
|align=center|11–6
|Carlos Eduardo
|Decision (unanimous)
|ACB 82: Silva vs. Kolobegov
|
|align=center|3
|align=center|5:00
|São Paulo, Brazil
|
|-
|Win
|align=center|10–6
|James Austen Heidlage
|Decision (unanimous)
|LFA: Sioux Falls Fight Night 1
|
|align=center|3
|align=center|5:00
|Sioux Falls, South Dakota, United States
|Return to Light Heavyweight.
|-
|Loss
|align=center|9–6
|Oluwale Bamgbose
|KO (head kick and punches)
|UFC Fight Night: Cowboy vs. Cowboy
|
|align=center|1
|align=center|1:00
|Pittsburgh, Pennsylvania, United States
|
|-
|Win
|align=center|9–5
|Antônio dos Santos
|TKO (finger injury)
|UFC Fight Night: Machida vs. Dollaway
|
|align=center|2
|align=center|1:01
|Barueri, Brazil
|
|-
|Loss
|align=center|8–5
|Kiichi Kunimoto
|Submission (rear-naked choke)
|UFC 174
|
|align=center|1
|align=center|2:52
|Vancouver, British Columbia, Canada
|
|-
|Loss
|align=center|8–4
|Cezar Ferreira
|Decision (split)
|UFC Fight Night: Belfort vs. Henderson
|
|align=center|3
|align=center|5:00
|Goiânia, Brazil
|
|-
|Win
|align=center|8–3
|Eddie Mendez
|Submission (arm-triangle choke)
|UFC on Fuel TV: Nogueira vs. Werdum
|
|align=center|1
|align=center|2:20
|Fortaleza, Brazil
|
|-
|Loss
|align=center|7–3
|C.B. Dollaway
|Decision (split)
|UFC on FX: Belfort vs. Bisping
|
|align=center|3
|align=center|5:00
|São Paulo, Brazil
|
|-
|Win
|align=center|7–2
|Ricardo Silva
|Submission (rear-naked choke)
|Pretorian 1
|
|align=center|1
|align=center|4:01
|São Paulo, Brazil
|
|-
|Win
|align=center|6–2
|Gilklei Antonio Silva
|Submission (punches)
|Blaze FC 1
|
|align=center|1
|align=center|1:44
|Curitiba, Brazil
|
|-
|Win
|align=center|5–2
|Mauricio Alonso
|Decision (unanimous)
|First Class Fight 5
|
|align=center|3
|align=center|5:00
|São Paulo, Brazil
|
|-
|Win
|align=center|4–2
|Yuri Villas Boas
|Submission (arm-triangle choke)
|Hero Kombat 1
|
|align=center|1
|align=center|2:14
|São Paulo, Brazil
|
|-
|Loss
|align=center|3–2
|Gary Padilla
|TKO (punches)
|Bellator 1
|
|align=center|2
|align=center|3:04
|Hollywood, Florida, United States
|Middleweight debut.
|-
|Win
|align=center|3–1
|Cedric Marks
|Submission (triangle choke)
|Xtreme Fight Championship
|
|align=center|1
|align=center|2:06
|Austin, Texas, United States
|
|-
|Win
|align=center|2–1
|Lamont Lister
|Submission (armbar)
|District Combat Promotions 1
|
|align=center|3
|align=center|1:32
|Washington, D.C., United States
|
|-
|Loss
|align=center|1–1
|Mike Whitehead
|Decision (unanimous)
|Platinum Fighting Productions 1
|
|align=center|3
|align=center|5:00
|Quezon City, Philippines
|
|-
|Win
|align=center|1–0
|Jorge Luis Bezerra
|Submission (guillotine choke)
|Predador FC 2
|
|align=center|3
|align=center|0:43
|São Paulo, Brazil
|

Mixed martial arts exhibition record

|-
|Win
|align=center|3-0
|Sérgio Moraes
|KO (flying knee)
|The Ultimate Fighter: Brazil| (airdate)
|align=center|1
|align=center|4:07
|São Paulo, Brazil
|
|-
|Win
|align=center|2-0
|Renee Forte
|Submission (rear-naked choke)
|The Ultimate Fighter: Brazil| (airdate)
|align=center|2
|align=center|0:00
|São Paulo, Brazil
|
|-
|Win
|align=center|1-0
|Richardson Moreira
|Decision (unanimous)
|The Ultimate Fighter: Brazil''
| (airdate)
|align=center|2
|align=center|5:00
|São Paulo, Brazil
|
|-

See also
 List of current UFC fighters
 List of male mixed martial artists

References

External links
 
 
 

1982 births
Living people
Brazilian male mixed martial artists
Brazilian practitioners of Brazilian jiu-jitsu
People awarded a black belt in Brazilian jiu-jitsu
Brazilian male judoka
Brazilian male karateka
Ultimate Fighting Championship male fighters
Mixed martial artists utilizing karate
Mixed martial artists utilizing judo
Mixed martial artists utilizing Brazilian jiu-jitsu
Bellator male fighters
Brazilian people of Armenian descent
Sportspeople from São Paulo